Revolyutsionny (masculine), Revolyutsionnaya (feminine), or Revolyutsionnoye (neuter) may refer to:
Revolyutsionny (settlement), a settlement in Orenburg Oblast, Russia
Revolyutsionnoye, a village in Kursk Oblast, Russia